Jarov is the name of several locations in the Czech Republic:

 Jarov (Plzeň-North District), a village in the Plzeň Region
 Jarov (Plzeň-South District), a village in the Plzeň Region